Dinosaur classification began in 1842 when Sir Richard Owen placed Iguanodon, Megalosaurus, and Hylaeosaurus in "a distinct tribe or suborder of Saurian Reptiles, for which I would propose the name of Dinosauria."  In 1887 and 1888 Harry Seeley divided dinosaurs into the two orders Saurischia and Ornithischia, based on their hip structure. These divisions have proved remarkably enduring, even through several seismic changes in the taxonomy of dinosaurs.

The largest change was prompted by entomologist Willi Hennig's work in the 1957s, which evolved into modern cladistics. For specimens known only from fossils, the rigorous analysis of characters to determine evolutionary relationships between different groups of animals (clades) proved incredibly useful. When computer-based analysis using cladistics came into its own in the 1999s, paleontologists became among the first zoologists to almost wholeheartedly adopt the system. Progressive scrutiny and work upon dinosaurian interrelationships, with the aid of new discoveries that have shed light on previously uncertain relationships between taxa, have begun to yield a stabilizing classification since the mid-2000s. While cladistics is the predominant classificatory system among paleontology professionals, the Linnean system is still in use, especially in works intended for popular distribution.

Benton classification
As most dinosaur paleontologists have advocated a shift away from traditional, ranked Linnaean taxonomy in favor of rankless phylogenetic systems, few ranked taxonomies of dinosaurs have been published since the 1980s. The following schema is among the most recent, from the third edition of Vertebrate Palaeontology, a respected undergraduate textbook. While it is structured so as to reflect evolutionary relationships (similar to a cladogram), it also retains the traditional ranks used in Linnaean taxonomy. The classification has been updated from the second edition in 2000 to reflect new research, but remains fundamentally conservative. 

Michael Benton classifies all dinosaurs within the Series Amniota, Class Sauropsida, Subclass Diapsida, Infraclass Archosauromorpha, Division Archosauria, Subdivision Avemetatarsalia, Infradivision Ornithodira, and Superorder Dinosauria. Dinosauria is then divided into the two traditional orders, Saurischia and Ornithischia. The dagger (†) is used to indicate taxa with no living members.

Order Saurischia 

 Suborder Theropoda
 †Infraorder Herrerasauria
 †Infraorder Coelophysoidea
 †Infraorder Ceratosauria+
 †Division Neoceratosauria+
 †Subdivision Abelisauroidea
 †Family Abelisauridae
 †Family Noasauridae
 †Subdivision Ceratosauridae
 Infraorder Tetanurae
 †Division Megalosauria
 †Subdivision Spinosauroidea
 †Family Megalosauridae
 †Family Spinosauridae
 †Division Carnosauria
 †Subdivision Allosauroidea
 †Family Allosauridae
 †Family Carcharodontosauridae
 †Family Neovenatoridae
 †Family Metriacanthosauridae
 Division Coelurosauria
 †Family Coeluridae
 Subdivision Maniraptoriformes
 †Family Tyrannosauridae
 †Family Ornithomimidae
 Infradivision Maniraptora
 †Family Alvarezsauridae
 †Family Therizinosauridae
 †Cohort Deinonychosauria
 †Family Troodontidae
 †Family Dromaeosauridae
 Class Aves
 †Suborder Sauropodomorpha
 †Thecodontosaurus
 †Family Plateosauridae
 †Riojasaurus
 †Family Massospondylidae
 †Infraorder Sauropoda
 †Family Vulcanodontidae
 †Family Omeisauridae
 †Division Neosauropoda
 †Family Cetiosauridae
 †Family Diplodocidae
 †Subdivision Macronaria
 †Family Camarasauridae
 †Infradivision Titanosauriformes
 †Family Brachiosauridae
 †Cohort Somphospondyli
 †Family Euhelopodidae
 †Family Titanosauridae

†Order Ornithischia 
 †Family Pisanosauridae
 †Family Fabrosauridae
 †Suborder Thyreophora
 †Family Scelidosauridae
 †Infraorder Stegosauria
 †Infraorder Ankylosauria
 †Family Nodosauridae
 †Family Ankylosauridae
 †Suborder Cerapoda
 †Infraorder Pachycephalosauria
 †Infraorder Ceratopsia
 †Family Psittacosauridae
 †Family Protoceratopsidae
 †Family Ceratopsidae
 †Infraorder Ornithopoda
 †Family Heterodontosauridae
 †Family Hypsilophodontidae
 †Family Iguanodontidae *
 †Family Hadrosauridae

Weishampel/Dodson/Osmólska classification
The following is based on the second edition of The Dinosauria, a compilation of articles by experts in the field that provided the most comprehensive coverage of Dinosauria available when it was first published in 1990. The second edition updates and revises that work. 

The cladogram and phylogenetic definitions below reflect the current understanding of evolutionary relationships. The taxa and symbols in parentheses after a given taxa define these relationships. The plus symbol ("+") between taxa indicates the given taxa is a node-based clade, defined as comprising all descendants of the last common ancestor of the "added" taxa. The greater-than symbol (">") indicates the given taxon is a stem-based taxon, comprising all organisms sharing a common ancestor that is not also an ancestor of the "lesser" taxon.

Saurischia 
(Triceratops/Stegosaurus)
 Herrerasauria (Herrerasaurus > Liliensternus, Plateosaurus)
 Herrerasauridae (Herrerasaurus + Staurikosaurus)
 ? Eoraptor lunensis
 Sauropodomorpha (Saltasaurus > Theropoda)
 ? Saturnalia tupiniquim
 ? Thecodontosauridae
 Prosauropoda (Plateosaurus > Sauropoda)
 ? Thecodontosauridae
 ? Anchisauria (Anchisaurus + Melanorosaurus)
 ? Anchisauridae (Anchisaurus > Melanorosaurus)
 ? Melanorosauridae (Melanorosaurus > Anchisaurus)
 Plateosauria (Jingshanosaurus + Plateosaurus)
 Massospondylidae
 Yunnanosauridae
 Plateosauridae (Plateosaurus > Yunnanosaurus, Massospondylus)
 Sauropoda (Saltasaurus > Plateosaurus)
 ? Anchisauridae
 ? Melanorosauridae
 Blikanasauridae
 Vulcanodontidae
 Eusauropoda (Shunosaurus + Saltasaurus)
 ? Euhelopodidae
 Mamenchisauridae
 Cetiosauridae (Cetiosaurus > Saltasaurus)
 Neosauropoda (Diplodocus + Saltasaurus)
 Diplodocoidea (Diplodocus > Saltasaurus)
 Rebbachisauridae (Rebbachisaurus > Diplodocus)
 Flagellicaudata
 Dicraeosauridae (Dicraeosaurus > Diplodocus)
 Diplodocidae (Diplodocus > Dicraeosaurus, Apatosaurus)
 Macronaria (Saltasaurus > Diplodocus)
 ? Jobaria tiguidensis
 Camarasauromorpha (Camarasaurus + Saltasaurus)
 Camarasauridae
 Titanosauriformes (Brachiosaurus + Saltasaurus)
 Brachiosauridae (Brachiosaurus > Saltasaurus)
 Titanosauria (Saltasaurus > Brachiosaurus)
 Andesauridae
 Lithostrotia (Malawisaurus + Saltasaurus)
 Isisaurus colberti
 Paralititan stromeri
 Nemegtosauridae
 Saltasauridae (Opisthocoelicaudia + Saltasaurus)
 Theropoda (Passer domesticus > Cetiosaurus oxoniensis)
 ? Eoraptor lunensis
 ? Herrerasauridae
 Ceratosauria (Ceratosaurus nasicornis > Aves)
 ? Coelophysoidea (Coelophysis > Ceratosaurus)
 ? Dilophosaurus wetherilli
 Coelophysidae (Coelophysis + Megapnosaurus)
 ? Neoceratosauria (Ceratosaurus > Coelophysis)
 Ceratosauridae
 Abelisauroidea (Carnotaurus sastrei > C. nasicornis)
 Abelisauria (Noasaurus + Carnotaurus)
 Noasauridae
 Abelisauridae (Abelisaurus comahuensis + C. sastrei)
 Carnotaurinae (Carnotaurus > Abelisaurus)
 Abelisaurinae (Abelisaurus > Carnotaurus)
 Tetanurae (P. domesticus > C. nasicornis)
 ? Spinosauroidea (Spinosaurus aegyptiacus > P. domesticus)
 Megalosauridae (Megalosaurus bucklandii > P. domesticus, S. aegyptiacus, Allosaurus fragilis)
 Megalosaurinae (M. bucklandii > Eustreptospondylus oxoniensis)
 Eustreptospondylinae (E. oxoniensis > M. bucklandii)
 Spinosauridae (S. aegyptiacus > P. domesticus, M. bucklandii, A. fragilis)
 Baryonychinae (Baryonyx walkeri > S. aegyptiacus)
 Spinosaurinae (S. aegyptiacus > B. walkeri)
 Avetheropoda (A. fragilis + P. domesticus)
 Carnosauria (A. fragilis > Aves)
 ? Spinosauroidea
 Monolophosaurus jiangi
 Allosauroidea (A. fragilis + Sinraptor dongi)
 Allosauridae (A. fragilis > S. dongi, Carcharodontosaurus saharicus)
 Sinraptoridae (S. dongi > A. fragilis, C. saharicus)
 Carcharodontosauridae (C. saharicus > A. fragilis, S. dongi)
 Coelurosauria (P. domesticus > A. fragilis)
 Compsognathidae (Compsognathus longipes > P. domesticus)
 Proceratosaurus bradleyi
 Ornitholestes hermanni
 Tyrannoraptora (Tyrannosaurus rex + P. domesticus)
 Coelurus fragilis
 Tyrannosauroidea (T. rex > Ornithomimus velox, Deinonychus antirrhopus, A. fragilis)
 Dryptosauridae
 Tyrannosauridae (T. rex + Tarbosaurus bataar + Daspletosaurus torosus + Albertosaurus sarcophagus + Gorgosaurus libratus)
 Tyrannosaurinae (T. rex > A. sarcophagus)
 Albertosaurinae (A. sarcophagus > T. rex)
 Maniraptoriformes (O. velox + P. domesticus)
 Ornithomimosauria (Gallimimus bullatus + Ornithomimus edmontonicus + Pelecanimimus polyodon)
 Harpymimidae
 Garudimimidae
 Ornithomimidae
 Maniraptora (P. domesticus > O. velox)
 Oviraptorosauria (Oviraptor philoceratops > P. domesticus)
 Caenagnathoidea (O. philoceratops + Caenagnathus collinsi)
 Caenagnathidae (C. collinsi > O. philoceratops)
 Oviraptoridae (O. philoceratops > C. collinsi)
 Oviraptorinae (O. philoceratops + Citipati osmolskae)
 Therizinosauroidea (Therizinosaurus + Beipiaosaurus)
 Alxasauridae
 Therizinosauridae
 Paraves (P. domesticus > O. philoceratops)
 Eumaniraptora (P. domesticus + D. antirrhopus)
 Deinonychosauria (D. antirrhopus > P. domesticus or Dromaeosaurus albertensis + Troodon formosus)
 Troodontidae (T. formosus > Velociraptor mongoliensis)
 Dromaeosauridae (Microraptor zhaoianus + Sinornithosaurus millenii + V. mongoliensis)
 Avialae (Archaeopteryx + Neornithes)

Ornithischia 
(Iguanodon/Triceratops > Cetiosaurus/Tyrannosaurus)
 ? Lesothosaurus diagnosticus
 ? Heterodontosauridae
 Genasauria (Ankylosaurus + Triceratops)
 Thyreophora (Ankylosaurus > Triceratops)
 Scelidosauridae
 Eurypoda (Ankylosaurus + Stegosaurus)
 Stegosauria (Stegosaurus > Ankylosaurus)
 Huayangosauridae (Huayangosaurus > Stegosaurus)
 Stegosauridae (Stegosaurus > Huayangosaurus)
 Dacentrurus armatus
 Stegosaurinae (Stegosaurus > Dacentrurus)
 Ankylosauria (Ankylosaurus > Stegosaurus)
 Ankylosauridae (Ankylosaurus > Panoplosaurus)
 Gastonia burgei
 Shamosaurus scutatus
 Ankylosaurinae (Ankylosaurus > Shamosaurus)
 Nodosauridae (Panoplosaurus > Ankylosaurus)
 Cerapoda (Triceratops > Ankylosaurus)
 Ornithopoda (Edmontosaurus > Triceratops)
 ? Lesothosaurus diagnosticus
 ? Heterodontosauridae
 Euornithopoda
 Hypsilophodon foxii
 Thescelosaurus neglectus
 Iguanodontia (Edmontosaurus > Thescelosaurus)
 Tenontosaurus tilletti
 Rhabdodontidae
 Dryomorpha
 Dryosauridae
 Ankylopollexia
 Camptosauridae
 Styracosterna
 Lurdusaurus arenatus
 Iguanodontoidea (=Hadrosauriformes)
 Iguanodontidae
 Hadrosauridae (Telmatosaurus + Parasaurolophus + Corythosaurus)
 Telmatosaurus transsylvanicus
 Euhadrosauria
 Lambeosaurinae
 Saurolophinae (=Hadrosaurinae)
 Marginocephalia
 Pachycephalosauria (Pachycephalosaurus wyomingensis > Triceratops horridus)
 Goyocephala (Goyocephale + Pachycephalosaurus)
 Homalocephaloidea (Homalocephale + Pachycephalosaurus)
 Homalocephalidae
 Pachycephalosauridae
 Ceratopsia (Triceratops > Pachycephalosaurus)
 Psittacosauridae
 Neoceratopsia
 Coronosauria
 Protoceratopsidae
 Bagaceratopidae
 Ceratopsoidea
 Leptoceratopsidae
 Ceratopsomorpha
 Ceratopsidae (Triceratops + Styracosaurus)
 Centrosaurinae
 Chasmosaurinae

Baron/Norman/Barrett classification
In 2017 Matthew G. Baron and his colleagues published a new analysis proposing to put Theropoda (except Herrerasauridae) and Ornithischia within a group called Ornithoscelida (a name originally coined by Thomas Henry Huxley in 1870), redefining Saurischia to cover Sauropodomorpha and Herrerasauridae. Amongst other things this would require hypercarnivory to have evolved independently for Theropoda and Herrerasauridae. This scheme is currently debated among palaeontologists, with recent studies finding little difference between the traditional and newly proposed models.
 
Dinosauria
 Ornithoscelida
 Ornithischia
 Theropoda
 Saurischia
 Sauropodomorpha
 Herrerasauridae

Cau 2018 
In his paper about the stepwise evolution of the avian bauplan, Cau (2018) found in the parsimony analysis a polytomy between herrerasaur-grade taxa, Sauropodomorpha and the controversial Ornithoscelida. The Bayesian analysis, however, found weak support for the sister grouping of Dinosauria and Herrerasauria, but strong support for the dichotomy between Sauropodomorpha and Ornithoscelida, as shown below:

See also

 List of dinosaur genera

Footnotes

References
 

 

 .

 

Classification
Systems of animal taxonomy